Chan Choy Siong (1931 – 11 February 1981) was a Singaporean politician and women's rights activist. Chan was one of the first women to be elected to the Parliament.

Biography
Chan grew up in Chinatown. She attended Nanyang Girls' High School, but was unable to complete her studies due to financial constraints. Her father supported her pursuit of an education. 

At the age of 20, Chan joined the People's Action Party (PAP), and was committed to securing equal rights for women in Singapore, including equality in pay and for an end to legal polygamy.

In 1956, along with Ho Puay Choo and Oh Siew Chen, Chan created the Women's League within the PAP. She was subsequently co-opted into the party's Central Executive Committee (CEC) in 1957. That same year, she was also elected to become a city councillor. 

Chan, and seven other women were elected to the Legislative Assembly in 1959. Chan served as Assemblywoman and later Member of Parliament between 1959 and 1970. She was one of the first few women to be active in Singapore politics. 

Chan pushed for the passage of the Women's Charter and a monogamy proposal. In 1961, she created and led the Women's Affairs Bureau of the PAP. The Women's Charter Chan had pushed for, was passed in that same year.

Chan retired from politics in 1970.

Personal life
Chan was the wife of Ong Pang Boon, a prominent first-generation member of the People's Action Party (PAP). Her niece, Cheryl Chan, was elected in the 2015 and 2020 general election.

Death
In 1981, Chan died in a car accident.

Legacy
In 2005, Chan was honored by the Singapore Council of Women's Organisations (SCWO) by being added to the Wall of Fame. 

In 2014, Chan was inducted into the Singapore Women's Hall of Fame.

References

Citations

Sources

External links
 Media about Chan Choy Siong at the National Archives of Singapore

1931 births
1981 deaths
People's Action Party politicians
Singaporean people of Cantonese descent
Singaporean women's rights activists
Singaporean women in politics
Road incident deaths in Singapore
Members of the Parliament of Singapore